Hector Calma (born  March 2, 1960) is a Filipino former professional basketball player. At 5 feet and 8 inches, he played at the point guard position and was most notably associated with the San Miguel Beer team of the Philippine Basketball Association.

Collegiate and pre-PBA career 

Calma first became known on the collegiate basketball scene as a point guard of the Adamson Falcons, which played in the UAAP. Calma was a member of the Adamson team which in 1977 captured for the first time the UAAP Men's Basketball Championship, a feat which the university has yet to accomplish again. Calma attained further prominence as a member of the national team which qualified for several international tournaments during the 1980s, under the patronage of Danding Cojuangco and the guidance of coach Ron Jacobs. He was at the helm of the 1982 squad that captured the Asian Youth Championship of that year, beating China in the finals. In 1985, with Calma starting at point guard, the national team unexpectedly captured the William Jones Cup, beating out in the process a highly regarded American team composed of NCAA Division I players and coached by Purdue's Gene Keady. The following year, the Philippine national team would win the Asian Basketball Confederation Championship for the first time since 1973.

During that period, his widely reported relationship with the swimmer (and future TV host) Christine Jacob also kept his name in the public eye. Calma eventually married Ines Ortiz, a former employee of the San Miguel public relations office.

Professional career 

In 1985, the national team, under the banner of Northern Consolidated Cement, competed as a guest team in the PBA, winning the 1985 PBA Reinforced Conference. This marked Calma's first appearance in the PBA, albeit as an amateur playing with a guest team.

Calma's formal professional basketball career began at the age of 26 in the 1986 PBA Open Conference when he, along with several of his national teammates, were absorbed by San Miguel Beer when it rejoined the PBA  under the name Magnolia Cheese after a brief period of disbandment. Within a year, the renamed San Miguel Beer, coached by Norman Black, would win its first PBA Championship with Calma starting at point guard.

From 1987 to 1989, San Miguel would win 6 of 7 PBA conference championships, including the coveted Grand Slam in 1989. Calma was not known for his scoring, but his skills as a playmaker sparked the SMB offense during those storied years. He was also voted 3X Finals MVP on their Grand Slam success. In a team that featured explosive scorers such as Samboy Lim, Ricardo Brown, and Ramon Fernandez, Calma's playmaking skills was highly regarded. As a result, Calma was named three times to the PBA Mythical First Team, in 1987, 1988, and 1989. During those 3 years, Calma posted average of 10.6 points (on 50.3% shooting) and 5.3 assists per game. Yet as the 1990 official PBA Annual noted, "Numbers just can't determine this little guy's true worth - he just creates so many offensive situations which most often draw the line between victory and defeat."

After the FIBA allowed in 1989 the participation of professional basketball players in international competitions, Calma was recruited twice to rejoin the Philippine National Team. Calma played in the 1990 and 1994 teams that participated in the Asian Games, the 1990 team capturing the silver medal.

Retirement 

Calma's career faded in the 1990s with the emergence of younger point guards such as Ronnie Magsanoc and Johnny Abarrientos.  Adding to this were the injuries he sustained both from his collegiate and professional years.  Alongside teammate Ramon Fernandez, he decided to leave basketball as both players announced their retirement before the start of the 1995 season of the PBA.  After his retirement, Calma became involved in the front office of the Coca-Cola Tigers and the San Miguel Beermen. He served as the team manager of the Beermen until the end of 2013.

In 2000, Calma was named to the PBA's 25th Anniversary All-Time Team. He was joined in that honor by two of his teammates from the SMB Grand Slam team, Ramon Fernandez and Samboy Lim

Personal life 
His son, Andres, is a motorsports rider, having won a championship title in the Vios Cup Season 2 in 2015.

See also
Philippine Basketball Association
Philippine national basketball team
San Miguel Beermen
History of Philippine Basketball
PBA's 25th Anniversary All-Time Team
Ron Jacobs

References

External links 
 PBA 25 Greatest

Notes

1960 births
Living people
Asian Games medalists in basketball
Asian Games silver medalists for the Philippines
Basketball players at the 1990 Asian Games
Basketball players at the 1994 Asian Games
Basketball players from Metro Manila
Medalists at the 1990 Asian Games
Philippine Basketball Association All-Stars
Philippine Basketball Association executives
Philippine Basketball Association players with retired numbers
Philippines men's national basketball team players
Filipino men's basketball players
Point guards
San Miguel Beermen players
Sportspeople from Manila
Adamson Soaring Falcons basketball players